Dino Mako is a village of the Mirpur Mathelo in Ghotki District.
, Sindh province, Pakistan.

References

Villages in Ghotki District